Fontenoy may refer to:
Battle of Fontenoy (841)
Battle of Fontenoy (1745)
Fontenoy (novel) by Liam Mac Cóil

People
Maud Fontenoy (born 1977), French sailor

Places

Belgium 
, a village in the municipality of Antoing, Belgium

France 
Fontenoy, Aisne, in the Aisne département
Fontenoy, Yonne, in the Yonne département
Fontenoy-la-Joûte, in the Meurthe-et-Moselle département (a book town)
Fontenoy-le-Château, in the Vosges département
Fontenoy-sur-Moselle, in the Meurthe-et-Moselle département

United States 
Fontenoy, Wisconsin, an unincorporated community in Brown County, Wisconsin

See also
Fontenay (disambiguation)